The Last Man is a 2019 Canadian science fiction film directed by Rodrigo H. Vila and starring Hayden Christensen and Harvey Keitel.

Synopsis
Kurt (Christensen) a veteran suffering from PTSD, returns home. A local street prophet Noe (Keitel) predicts that a catastrophic storm will strike. Kurt takes Noe’s advice and prepares for an impending disaster, and he meets Jessica (Solari) who also begins believing in the upcoming predictions.

Cast
Hayden Christensen as Kurt
Harvey Keitel as Noe
Marco Leonardi as Antonio
Liz Solari as Jessica
Justin Kelly as Johnny
Rafael Spregelburd as Gomez

Release
The film was released in theaters and on video-on-demand on January 18, 2019. The film grossed an estimated $12,047 at the box office.

Reception
The film received generally negative reviews from critics, with criticism focusing on the film's plot and on Christensen's performance as Kurt. Christy Lemire of RogerEbert.com gave it thumbs down, saying that the film was "a thoroughly unpleasant experience from start to finish, and not even in an artful way."

Noel Murray of LA Times criticized Christensen's performance and the script, while praising the film's gloomy ambience. He said that "the individual scenes feel disconnected and incomplete, stitched together by rambling, discombobulated dialogue that even the actors don’t seem to understand. The premise is effectively eerie; the presentation depressingly sloppy."

References

External links
 
 

Canadian science fiction films
English-language Canadian films
2019 science fiction films
2010s English-language films
2010s Canadian films